A pass-through certificates is an instrument that evidences the ownership of two or more equipment trust certificates. In other words, equipment trust certificates may be bundled into a pass-through structure as a means of diversifying the asset pool and/or increasing the size of the offering. The principal and interest payments on the equipment trust certificates are "passed through" to certificate holders. A pass-through certificate is an instrument which signifies transfer of interest in receivables in favor of the holder of the Pass Through Certificate. The investor in a pass-through transaction acquire the receivables subject to all their fluctuation, prepayments etc. the material risks and rewards in the asset portfolio, such as the risk of interest rate variations, risk of prepayment etc., transferred  to the investor.

In short, the term "pass-through" means the issuing company, such as Ginnie Mae has received money from the homeowner and passed it to the investor.

References

Securities (finance)